The Book of Fritz Leiber is a collection of short stories and articles by American writer Fritz Leiber. It was first published in paperback in January 1974 by DAW Books. It was later gathered together with The Second Book of Fritz Leiber into the hardcover omnibus collection The Book of Fritz Leiber, Volume I & II (Gregg Press, 1980).

The book consists of ten fantasy, science fiction and horror short stories alternating with nine related articles, together with a foreword by the author. Some pieces were original to the collection. Others were originally published in the magazines Rogue for January 1963, Worlds of Tomorrow for August 1963, The Magazine of Fantasy and Science Fiction for December 1951 and April 1963, Galaxy Science Fiction for August 1952 and February 1968, and Broadside Magazine for December 1965, and the collection The Dark Brotherhood and Other Pieces (1966).

Contents
"Foreword" 
"The Spider" (1963)
"Monsters and Monster Lovers" (1965)
"A Hitch in Space" (1963)
"Hottest and Coldest Molecules" (1952)
"Kindergarten" (1963)
"Those Wild Alien Words: I" (1974)
"Crazy Annaoj" (1968)
"Debunking the I Machine" (1949)
"When the Last Gods Die" (1951)
"King Lear" (1934)
"Yesterday House" (1952)
"After Such Knowledge" 
"Knight to Move" (1965)
"Weird World of the Knight" (1960)
"To Arkham and the Stars" (1966)
"The Whisperer" Re-examined" (1964)
"Beauty and the Beasts" 
"Masters of Mace and Magic" 
"Cat's Cradle"

Sources

External links
 Fantastic Fiction entry

1974 short story collections
Fantasy short story collections
Science fiction short story collections
Horror short story collections
Short story collections by Fritz Leiber
Essay collections
DAW Books books